Kemal Akbaba (born 1 April 1988) is a Turkish football player who plays as a striker for Ayvalıkgücü Belediyespor.

External links
 
 
 

1988 births
People from Selim
Living people
Turkish footballers
Turkey youth international footballers
Turkey under-21 international footballers
Association football forwards
Gençlerbirliği S.K. footballers
Hacettepe S.K. footballers
Samsunspor footballers
Türk Telekom G.S.K. footballers
Kırşehirspor footballers
Karacabey Belediyespor footballers
Büyükşehir Belediye Erzurumspor footballers
Aydınspor footballers
Muğlaspor footballers
Edirnespor footballers
Kahramanmaraşspor footballers
Pazarspor footballers
Vefa S.K. footballers
TKİ Tavşanlı Linyitspor footballers
Süper Lig players
TFF First League players
TFF Second League players
TFF Third League players